The Heritage Minutes is a series of sixty-second short films, each illustrating an important moment in Canadian history. The Minutes integrate Canadian history, folklore and myths into dramatic storylines. Like the Canada Vignettes of the 1970s, the Minutes themselves have become a part of Canadian culture and been the subject of academic studies as well as parody.

The Minutes were first introduced on March 31, 1991, as part of a one-off history quiz show hosted by Wayne Rostad. Originally distributed to schools, they appeared frequently on Canadian television and in cinemas before feature films, and were later available online and on DVD. "Radio minutes" have also been made. From 1991 to 1995 fifty episodes were released. In 2012, new Minutes were produced in the lead-up to Canada's sesquicentennial (150th anniversary of Canadian Confederation) in 2017; these included themes in Canadian history, such as the Canadian Indian residential school system.

Background 
The thirteen original short films were broken up and run between shows on CBC Television and the CTV Network. The continued broadcast of the Minutes and the production of new ones was pioneered by Charles Bronfman's CRB Foundation (subsequently The Historica Dominion Institute), Canada Post (with Bell Canada being a later sponsor), Power Broadcasting (the broadcasting arm of the Power Corporation of Canada), and the National Film Board. They were devised, developed, and largely narrated (as well as scripted) by noted Canadian broadcaster Patrick Watson, while the producer of the series was Robert Guy Scully.

In 2009, "The Historica Foundation of Canada" merged with "The Dominion Institute" to become "The Historica-Dominion Institute," a national charitable organization. In September 2013, the organization changed its name to "Historica Canada". While the foundations have not paid networks to air Minutes, in the early years they have paid to have them run in cinema theatres across the country. The Canadian Radio-television and Telecommunications Commission (CRTC) has ruled that Heritage Minutes are an "on-going dramatic series"; each vignette thus counts as ninety-seconds of a station's Canadian content requirements.

The first sets of Heritage Minutes were released in five segments  between 1991 and 2000. A set of eight new Heritage Minutes, covering military moments in Canadian history, were released in 2005. In 2012, two new Minutes were created on the War of 1812 in anticipation of the war's bicentenary, and in 2014 two more Minutes were released on John A. Macdonald and George-Étienne Cartier that had been filmed in and around Toronto in September 2013. To honour the centenary of the start of World War I two Minutes were released: one on the Winnipeg Falcons in 2014 and one on Canadian Nursing Sisters in early 2015. In September 2015, to commemorate the 35th anniversary of Terry Fox's run to conquer cancer, Historica released a "Minute" on Fox's inspirational run. 
February 2016 saw the release of a "Minute" on Viola Desmond, a trailblazing black female entrepreneur from Halifax who spoke out against racial discrimination in Nova Scotia. On the 21st of June, 2016, the 20th anniversary of National Aboriginal Day, Historica Canada released two new Minutes. The first tells the story of Chanie "Charlie" Wenjack, whose death sparked the first inquest into the treatment of Indigenous children in Canadian residential schools. The second, Naskumituwin, highlights the making of Treaty 9 from the perspective of historical witness George Spence, an 18-year-old Cree hunter from Albany, James Bay. On October 19, 2016, Historica Canada released another Heritage Minute that shows a story about an Inuit artist named Kenojuak Ashevak. It is also the first Heritage minute that is narrated on not just its official languages (English and French) but also a third language, where this Heritage Minute is narrated in Inuktitut.

A 2012 Ipsos Reid poll of 3,900 Canadians selected the five most popular Minutes. Tied for first place were the episodes on Jackie Robinson and the Halifax Explosion, followed by Jennie Kidd Trout, Winnie-the-Pooh and Laura Secord.

List of Heritage Minutes 

Not all of the Heritage Minutes episodes have actually aired. 85 (later 86) of them are available for viewing online (as listed below); however, an episode on Canadian Peacekeepers in Cyprus, which was pulled from broadcast shortly after its 1991 release, was not made available online through Historica Canada until 2016.

Parodies 

 The Canadian sketch comedy shows This Hour Has 22 Minutes, The Rick Mercer Report, Royal Canadian Air Farce, and Rock et Belles Oreilles, have parodied the Heritage Minute format in sketches, or used the format for satire.
 The Comedy Network has aired short parodies titled "Sacrilege Moments".
 Canadian rapper Classified parodied the Heritage Minute in his music video for the song "O Canada..."
 Canadian cartoonist Kate Beaton adapted the Heritage Minute format in a comic about Margaret Trudeau, wife of former Canadian Prime Minister Pierre Trudeau.
 In 2007, the Internet comedy group LoadingReadyRun celebrated Canada Day by telling the story of the Heritage Minutes in the format of a Heritage Minute.
 In the second episode of season 1 of Canada's Drag Race, the main challenge is based on parodying Heritage Minutes as "Her-itage Moments"; the parodied ads were the one on Nellie McClung and the suffragist movement in Manitoba, and the one about Dr. Wilder Penfield's advances in neuroscience research.

See also 

Canadian folklore
 Canada: A People's History
 Events of National Historic Significance
 The Greatest Canadian
 Hinterland Who's Who
 National Historic Sites of Canada
 Persons of National Historic Significance
The Log Driver's Waltz
Historica Canada

References

Further reading

External links 
 Historica Canada
Heritage Minutes - official YouTube channel

Public service announcements
Studies of Canadian history
1991 Canadian television series debuts
Canadian television commercials
Interstitial television shows
1990s Canadian anthology television series
Canadian historical television series
2000s Canadian anthology television series
2010s Canadian anthology television series
2020s Canadian anthology television series